Rüdiger Selig (born 19 February 1989) is a German professional road racing cyclist, who currently rides for UCI WorldTeam .

Born in Zwenkau, Selig competed as an amateur until the middle of 2011, when he joined  as a stagiaire. In October, he won the Binche–Tournai–Binche race. In September 2015  announced that Selig would join them for the 2016 season, in order to strengthen the team's sprint train. He was named in the start list for the 2016 Vuelta a España and the start list for the 2017 Giro d'Italia. In June 2017, he was named in the startlist for the 2017 Tour de France.

Major results

2010
 1st Stage 5 Tour de Berlin
 3rd Overall Dookoła Mazowsza
2011
 1st Binche–Tournai–Binche
 1st Stage 5 Tour de Berlin
 2nd Overall Dookoła Mazowsza
 3rd Road race, National Under-23 Road Championships
 4th Road race, UCI Under-23 Road World Championships
 4th ProRace Berlin
 5th Rund um den Finanzplatz Eschborn-Frankfurt U23
 8th Overall Tour de Wallonie-Picarde
2012
 2nd ProRace Berlin
 6th Volta Limburg Classic
 8th Münsterland Giro
2013
 1st Volta Limburg Classic
 1st Stage 3 (TTT) Tour des Fjords
 7th ProRace Berlin
2015
 1st Prologue (TTT) Tour of Austria
 7th Down Under Classic
 10th Clásica de Almería
2017
 2nd Clásica de Almería
 3rd Grand Prix de Fourmies
 7th Nokere Koerse
2018
 1st Stage 2 Okolo Slovenska
2019
 6th Trofeo Palma
 8th Gent–Wevelgem
 10th Road race, UEC European Road Championships
2023
 6th Bredene Koksijde Classic

Grand Tour general classification results timeline

References

External links

1989 births
Living people
People from Zwenkau
People from Bezirk Leipzig
German male cyclists
Cyclists from Saxony